John MacInnes (Scottish Gaelic: Iain MacAonghuis, Iain mac Ruairidh mhic Iain mhic Iain mhic Néill mhic Mhaol Mhoire mhic Iain mhic Mhaol Chaluim), 3 April 1930 in Uig, Lewis – 10 May 2019, was a Scottish Gaelic scholar and authority on Scottish Gaelic oral tradition. He was born in Uig, Lewis, but grew up on Raasay, and took an active interest in Gaelic tradition while still young and made a conscious effort to seek it out amongst his family and community.

In 1948, John MacInnes went to study at the University of Edinburgh and was awarded a scholarship in Gaelic established by the Church of Scotland. In 1958, MacInnes was appointed to a Junior Research Fellowship in the School of Scottish Studies and spent years conducting fieldwork amongst Gaelic speakers in Scotland and in Nova Scotia, Canada. MacInnes formally retired from the School of Scottish Studies in 1993.

John MacInnes penned a significant body of seminal articles on aspects of Scottish Gaelic linguistics, folklore, oral narrative, song, dance, history and indigenous beliefs which continue to inform contemporary scholarship. A thorough bibliography and selection of these essays was published as Dùthchas nan Gàidheal. A special issue of the journal Scottish Studies contains biographical information and a range of articles celebrating and extending MacInnes’ intellectual and cultural legacy.

In 2015, John MacInnes was recognised with the 'Services to Gaelic' Award by The Scottish Traditional Music Hall of Fame, and received the award for 'Best Contribution' from the Daily Record and Bòrd na Gàidhlig Scottish Gaelic Awards in the same year.

He was married to Wendy MacInnes (née Dunn) with whom he had two children, Ruairi and Catríona. He has two grandchildren, Sinéad and Roddy.

Bibliography

Books
 Dùthchas nan Gàidheal: Selected Essays of John MacInnes (2006) (edited by Michael Newton)

References

1930 births
2019 deaths
Scottish Gaelic language activists
People from the Isle of Lewis
Oral historians
Scottish scholars and academics
Historians of Scotland
20th-century Scottish historians
Alumni of the University of Edinburgh
Historians of Canada
Scottish linguists
Scottish folklorists
Dance historians
Music historians
Scottish folk-song collectors
Celtic studies scholars